The following is a list of transfers for the 2015 Major League Soccer season. Expansion sides New York City FC and Orlando City SC were able to sign players during the 2014 season, beginning on June 2, 2014 with New York City's agreement to bring in former Atlético Madrid striker David Villa as a Designated Player. Both New York City and Orlando City's MLS moves, as well as the rest of the transactions, will be made during the 2014–15 MLS offseason all the way through to the roster freeze on September 1, 2015.

Transfers

 Player officially joined his new club on January 1, 2015.
 Only rights to player were acquired.
 Player will officially join his new club on July 1, 2015.

References

External links
 Official Site of Major League Soccer

2015

Major League
Major League